Egon Hanusz (born 25 September 1997) is a Hungarian handballer for TVB Stuttgart and the Hungarian national team.

References

External links

Handball-base 
Global sports archive

1997 births
Living people
People from Nagyatád
Hungarian male handball players
Sportspeople from Somogy County